Woodbury Township is the name of some places in the U.S. state of Pennsylvania:
 Woodbury Township, Bedford County, Pennsylvania
 Woodbury Township, Blair County, Pennsylvania

See also 
 North Woodbury Township, Blair County, Pennsylvania
 South Woodbury Township, Bedford County, Pennsylvania
 Woodbury Township (disambiguation)
 Wood Township, Pennsylvania
 Woodcock Township, Pennsylvania
 Woodward Township, Lycoming County, Pennsylvania

Pennsylvania township disambiguation pages